John Makransky is an American professor of Buddhism and comparative theology at Boston College, and a meditation teacher within the Nyingma tradition of Tibetan Buddhism.

Career
Makransky practices the meditations of compassion and wisdom from Tibetan traditions and has introduced new ways of bringing these powerful contemplative methods into the secular world of social service and social justice by making them newly accessible to people of all backgrounds and faiths. He has also helped Western Buddhists deepen their contemplative experience of presence and loving compassion in the context of socially engaged practice

Makransky has studied and practiced Tibetan Buddhism since 1978 under the guidance of Nyingma, Kagyu, and Gelug teachers. In 2000 he was installed as a lama in the Tibetan lineage of his first root teacher, Nyoshul Khen Rinpoche, by Lama Surya Das.  He met his second root teacher, Chökyi Nyima Rinpoche in 2002, and now serves as a senior faculty advisor and lecturer for Chokyi Nyima Rinpoche's Centre for Buddhist Studies in Bodhanath, Nepal (affiliated with Kathmandu University and Rangjung Yeshe Institute).

Makransky is the guiding meditation teacher of the Foundation for Active Compassion, which provides meditation workshops and retreats not only in Buddhist contemplative settings but also in secular settings for social justice activists, social workers, counselors, teachers, therapists, and health care and other helping professionals. These workshops are sponsored by diverse organizations, such as Boston College's Graduate Schools of Social Work and of Theology and Ministry, the American Association of Pastoral Counselors, Contemplative Mind in Society, the Institute of Meditation and Psychotherapy, and the Barre Center for Buddhist Studies. He recently published a book of contemplative practices and teachings to empower people in relationships, work, service and social action entitled Awakening Through Love: Unveiling Your Deepest Goodness (Wisdom Publications, 2007).

Makransky is also author of Buddhahood Embodied: Sources of Controversy in India and Tibet, coeditor of Buddhist Theology: Critical Reflections by Contemporary Buddhist Scholars, and the author of many articles and essays. Within the American Academy of Religion (AAR), he is co-chair of the Buddhist Theological Reflection Group and a faculty instructor for the AAR's Summer Seminars on Religious Pluralism and Comparative Theology. In addition, he is senior faculty advisor and lecturer for Chokyi Nyima Rinpoche's Centre for Buddhist Studies in Nepal, affiliated with Kathmandu University and Rangjung Yeshe Institute.

He lives outside of Boston with his wife and two sons.

Academic institutions and groups
 Boston College Department of Theology
 Boston College Comparative Theology Program
 Center for Buddhist Studies in Nepal
 Society for Comparative Theology
 European Network of Buddhist-Christian Studies
 American Academy of Religion / Buddhist Constructive Reflection Group
 Society for Buddhist-Christian Studies
 International Association of Buddhist Studies

Bibliography
 John Makransky: (2007) Awakening Through Love: Unveiling Your Deepest Goodness (Wisdom Publications)
 John J. Makransky: (August 1997) Buddhahood Embodied: Sources of Controversy in India and Tibet, Publisher: State University of New York Press,  (10),  (13)

References

External links
 Articles and essays
 Quotes
 Personal website
 Foundation for Active Compassion website

Living people
Boston College faculty
Tibetan Buddhist spiritual teachers
Tibetan Buddhists from the United States
Year of birth missing (living people)